Ned Jenkins (28 July 1904 – 8 November 1990) was an international rugby union lock who represented Wales and played club rugby for Aberavon. Like teammate Tom Arthur, Jenkins was an amateur boxer.

Rugby career
Jenkins joined Aberavon in 1925 at the height of their 'golden era' which saw the team crowned Welsh Club Champions four consecutive years from the 1923/24 to the 1926/27 season. Jenkins would later captain Aberavon for three seasons in the late early 1930s and was part of the joint Neath / Aberavon team that narrowly lost to the 1930 touring South Africans.
 
Jenkins was first capped for Wales against Scotland on 3 February 1927. In the programme for the match, Jenkins was described as 'the fourth member of the Glamorgan Constabulary on duty today, and not the least clever by any means'. Jenkins played in five Five Nations Championships, including John Bassett's 1931 Championship winning side. Of the 1931 tournament matches, the encounter with Ireland was the most notable, with heavy injuries on both sides as Wales chased the Championship and Ireland the Triple Crown. Jenkins himself suffered a neck injury that caused him some paralysis, though he finished the game on the pitch. Wales won the game 15-3, helped by the fact that Ireland lost Crowe to a concussion in the second half.

Jenkins was also selected to face two touring sides, the 1927 Waratahs and the 1931 South Africans.

International matches played
Wales
  1928, 1930, 1931, 1932
  1927, 1928, 1929, 1930, 1931
   1927, 1928, 1930, 1931, 1932
  New South Wales Waratahs 1927
  1927, 1928, 1930, 1931, 1932
  1931

Bibliography

References 

1904 births
1990 deaths
Aberavon RFC players
Bridgend RFC players
Cardiff RFC players
Glamorgan Police officers
Glamorgan County RFC players
Glamorgan Police RFC players
Kenfig Hill RFC players
Rugby union locks
Rugby union players from Tonyrefail
Wales international rugby union players
Welsh police officers
Welsh rugby union players